The Papua New Guinea national netball team represent Papua New Guinea in international netball competition. They are nicknamed the "Pepes", which comes from the Keapara word for "butterfly". Papua New Guinea played in the 2010 Commonwealth Games, finishing 11th. As of 2 December 2019, the Pepes are 31st in the INF World Rankings.

Players
As of July 2011.

Competitive record
As of 4 October 2010.

See also
 Netball in Papua New Guinea

References

National netball teams of Oceania
Netball in Papua New Guinea
netball